{{safesubst:#invoke:RfD|||month = March
|day = 15
|year = 2023
|time = 01:52
|timestamp = 20230315015240

|content=
REDIRECT Rishi Sunak

}}